Parornix tenella is a moth of the family Gracillariidae. It is known from Austria, Croatia, the Czech Republic, Hungary, Sicily, mainland Italy, Romania, Slovakia, Spain and Ukraine.

References

Parornix
Moths of Europe
Moths described in 1919